The Faribault Public Schools comprise the public elementary and secondary schools and other educational facilities in and near the city of Faribault, Minnesota, United States.  The school district, ISD #656, includes the city and surrounding rural communities.  The district operates operate an early childhood center, four elementary schools (one of which is a charter school), a middle school, the Faribault High School, the Area Learning Center, and the Faribault Education Center which offers adult education.

References 

Schools in Rice County, Minnesota
Public schools in Minnesota
School districts in Minnesota